Federico Rafael González (born January 6, 1987) is an Argentine professional footballer who plays for Carlos A. Mannucci.

References

External links

Living people
1987 births
Argentine footballers
Argentine expatriate footballers
Association football forwards
Sportspeople from Entre Ríos Province
Club Atlético Independiente footballers
Ferro Carril Oeste footballers
Club Puebla players
Atlético de Rafaela footballers
Club Atlético Tigre footballers
Estudiantes de La Plata footballers
Audax Italiano footballers
Quilmes Atlético Club footballers
Argentine Primera División players
Primera Nacional players
Liga MX players
Chilean Primera División players
Expatriate footballers in Chile
Argentine expatriate sportspeople in Chile
Expatriate footballers in Mexico
Argentine expatriate sportspeople in Mexico